Paseo La Plaza is a cultural and commercial complex in the San Nicolás section of Buenos Aires, Argentina.

Overview
Paseo La Plaza was built where the bustling Mercado Modelo once stood. Serving residents in or near the 1600 block of Corrientes Avenue for much of the twentieth century, the ornate market hall was also popular for its Bachín y Pichín Restaurant. Shuttered during Argentina's difficult 1980s, the central location of the acre-size lot quickly attracted investors' interest, however, and the property was purchased by the La Plaza Group, a theatre production company led by Pablo Kompel.

The market hall was demolished in favor of an open-air center, though a number of the former building's features, such as its colonnade and porticos, were preserved. The Pablo Neruda Salon, a theater and cinema hall, was opened on July 12, 1989, with a performance by world-renowned mime Marcel Marceau, and the entire center was formally inaugurated on September 28. 

Lushly landscaped, Paseo La Plaza was designed as an urban oasis in one of Buenos Aires' most densely populated areas.  A cultural as well as commercial center, it continues to host an active repertoire in its two theatres: the Pablo Neruda and Pablo Picasso Salons (with 520 and 440 seats, respectively), as well as in its patio amphitheater. The Neruda Salon also hosts local radio host Alejandro Dolina's news and commentary program, La venganza será terrible. The development, the first of its kind in Buenos Aires, attracts over 350,000 theater-goers a year, becoming the most important such center in Argentina.

The center also includes a small convention center for up to 1200 visitors, divided into the Alfonsina Storni, Pablo Casals and Julio Cortázar Rooms. A promenade of 21 retail outlets, and 14 restaurants and bars, is interspersed along the patios; in all, Paseo La Plaza attracts around half a million visitors a month.

References

External links
Paseo La Plaza

Theatres in Buenos Aires
Shopping malls in Buenos Aires
1989 establishments in Argentina
Commercial buildings completed in 1989
Shopping malls established in 1989